Muhammad Nazrul Islam (born 3 August 1951) is a Bangladesh Awami League politician. He is the incumbent Jatiya Sangsad member representing the Narsingdi-1 constituency since 2009. He served as the State Minister of Water Resources from 2014 to 2018.

Early life 
Islam was born on 3 August 1951 in Narsingdi, East Bengal in the then Dominion of Pakistan.

Career 
When the Bangladesh Liberation War started, Islam was a student at Dhaka University. He joined the Mukti Bahini and fought in the war. After the independence of Bangladesh he was commissioned in the Bangladesh Army. He received the gallantry award, Bir Protik, for his role in the war. He retired from the army in 1991 as a lieutenant colonel. He was elected to parliament in 2008, 2014 and 2018.

Personal life 
Islam is married to Farzana Nazrul.

References

Living people
1951 births
People from Narsingdi District
Recipients of the Bir Protik
Awami League politicians
Bangladesh Army officers
Mukti Bahini personnel
State Ministers of Water Resources (Bangladesh)
9th Jatiya Sangsad members
10th Jatiya Sangsad members
11th Jatiya Sangsad members